Effie Kapsalis (April 21, 1971 – December 11, 2022) was an American open access advocate known for work related to digital programs and initiatives, including those advanced at the Smithsonian Institution.

Early life
Kapsalis was born April 21, 1971 in Chicago, Illinois. She graduated from Indiana University Bloomington with a major in French language and literature. She went on to earn a  master's degree from the University of the Arts (Philadelphia) in industrial design and pervasive technology.

Career
As senior digital program officer at the Smithsonian, Kapsalis headed the team responsible for making 2.8 million high-resolution two- and three-dimensional images from the institute's collections openly available online in 2020. She worked to make the Smithsonian's archival collections more accessible online and authored a blog series titled Wonderful Women Wednesday. Kapsalis' work was featured on Open Minds…from Creative Commons in 2021.

In 2013 Kapsalis and Sara Snyder were the recipients of the inaugural Distinguished Service Award by the Wikimedia District of Columbia for their work within the Smithsonian Institute encouraging people to learn how to edit Wikipedia.

In 2016, Kapsalis was part of a South by Southwest (SXSW) panel, 'Give It Away to Get Rich: Open Cultural Heritage', in which she presented her 2016 report 'The Impact of Open Access on Galleries, Libraries, Museums, & Archives'. 'The Impact of Open Access' has been cited by over 40 peer-reviewed publications since then.

After a longtime battle with depression, Kapsalis died by suicide at her home in Maryland, on December 11, 2022, at the age of 51.

Publications
 
 
 
 Kapsalis, Effie, et al. (17 September 2009). "Smithsonian Team Flickr: a library, archives, and museums collaboration in web 2.0 space" (PDF). Archive Science. 8 (4):267–277. https://doi.org/10.1007/s10502-009-9089-y. Open access deposit. Retrieved 8 January 2023.

References
 

1971 births
2022 deaths
Smithsonian Institution people
People from Chicago
Indiana University Bloomington alumni
Open access activists
University of the Arts (Philadelphia) alumni
2022 suicides